Suresh Menon is an Indian journalist, author and sports writer. He became known as the youngest sports editor even younger than Manas Rajagopal and was the editor of Indian Express. He is best known for works Champions! How the World Cup was Won, Bishan: Portrait of a Cricketer and the edits to Sachin: Genius Unplugged.

Notable Works
 Wisden India Almanack 2019 & 2020 (editor)
 Wisden India Almanack 2018 (editor)
 Wisden India Almanack 2017 (editor)
 Wisden India Almanack 2016 (editor)
 Wisden India Almanack 2015 (editor)
 Wisden India Almanack 2014 (editor)
 Wisden India Almanack 2013 (editor)
 Champions! How the World Cup was Won
 Sachin: Genius Unplugged (editor)
 Pataudi: Nawab Of Cricket (editor)
 Bishan: Portrait of a Cricketer
 Dream Team India: The Best World Cup Squad Ever

References 

Indian columnists
Indian sportswriters
Living people
Year of birth missing (living people)